The Oceania Cycling Confederation (OCC) is recognised by the Union Cycliste International (UCI) as the regional governing body for the sport of cycling in the continent of Oceania. The OCC is one of five continental confederations recognised by the UCI, encompassing the continents of Africa, Asia, Europe, Oceania and Pan-America. The OCC is headquartered in Melbourne.

Management

Presidents

Dual Australian Olympian Tracey Gaudry is the current President of the Oceania Cycling Confederation, having been elected in December 2012. Gaudry replaced Michael Turtur who served between a four-year term between 2008 and 2012, following Ray Godkin, who served for 22 years since the inception of the Confederation in 1986. 

Executive Board

Representatives on UCI Management Committee

Oceania Cycling Championships

The Oceania Cycling Confederation organises all Oceania Cycling Championships. As of 2019 the OCC organises championships in track cycling, road cycling, mountain biking, BMX racing, and freestyle BMX.

Events

The Oceania Cycling Confederation oversees the UCI Oceania Tour a series of UCI road races in Australia and New Zealand and organises the Oceania Pacific Calendar a series of races in the Pacific.

Member Federations

As of 2021 the Oceania Cycling Confederation comprises eleven member federations - eight full members and three associate members.

Full Members

Associate Members

References

External links
Official website

Cycling organizations
Sports governing bodies in Oceania